The Kid from Left Field is a 1953 baseball comedy film starring Dan Dailey, Anne Bancroft, Lloyd Bridges, and Billy Chapin. The film marked the reunion of Dailey and director Harmon Jones who had teamed up at 20th Century Fox a year earlier in another baseball film, the biographical The Pride of St. Louis.

The film was remade for television in 1979, starring Gary Coleman, Gary Collins and Robert Guillaume.

Plot
Former ballplayer 'Coop' (Dailey) is working as a peanut vendor at the ballpark of a struggling major league club, the Bisons. He has passed on his love of the game to his son Christie (Chapin), but after sneaking his son into the game one too many times, he is fired from his job. Christie ingratiates himself with the former owner's niece (Bancroft) and gets his father's job back as well as a position as batboy for himself.

As a publicity stunt, Christie is named their youngest manager ever, but when he falls ill, Coop replaces him as manager. The Bisons win the pennant and earn a spot in the World Series.

Cast
Dan Dailey as Larry 'Pop' Cooper
Anne Bancroft as Marian Foley
Billy Chapin as Christie Cooper
Lloyd Bridges as Pete Haines
Ray Collins as Fred F. Whacker
Richard Egan as Billy Lorant
Bob Hopkins as Bobo Noonan
Alex Gerry as J.R. Johnson
Walter Sande as Barnes
Fess Parker as McDougal
Paul Wexler as umpire (uncredited)

See also
 The Pride of St. Louis (1952)

References

External links
 
 

1953 films
1950s English-language films
1950s sports comedy films
20th Century Fox films
American baseball films
American black-and-white films
American sports comedy films
Films directed by Harmon Jones
Films scored by Lionel Newman
Films with screenplays by Jack Sher
Publicity stunts in fiction
1950s American films